Luisa de Tenza, Lady of Espinardo, (in full), was a Spanish noblewoman.

Luisa de Tenza was the daughter of Alonso de Tenza, and wife Doña Aldonza de Cascales y Soto, a distant relative of Hernando de Soto. She was Lady of Espinardo, Ontur, Albatana and Mojón Blanco.

She married at Murcia Admiral Don Luis Fajardo. They were the parents of Don Juan Fajardo de Tenza, 1st Marquess of Espinardo, and Don Alonso Fajardo de Entenza, Spanish Governor-General and Captain-General of the Islands of the Philippines from 3 July 1618 to July 1624.

Sources

Luisa
17th-century Spanish people